Valéria Kumizaki (born 15 April 1985) is a Brazilian karateka. She won the silver medal in the women's kumite 55 kg event at the 2016 World Karate Championships held in Linz, Austria. She is also a two-time gold medalist in her event at the Pan American Games.

Career 

She won the gold medal in the women's kumite 55 kg event at the 2014 Pan American Sports Festival held in Tlaxcala, Mexico. In 2017, at the World Games held in Wrocław, Poland, she won the gold medal in the women's kumite -55 kg event. In the final, she defeated Wen Tzu-yun of Taiwan.

In 2019, she won the gold medal in the women's kumite -55 kg event at the Pan American Games held in Lima, Peru. She also won the gold medal in this event at the 2015 Pan American Games held in Toronto, Canada. In both events, Kathryn Campbell of Canada won the silver medal.

In June 2021, she competed at the World Olympic Qualification Tournament held in Paris, France hoping to qualify for the 2020 Summer Olympics in Tokyo, Japan. She was eliminated in her third match by Ivet Goranova of Bulgaria. In November 2021, she competed in the women's 55 kg event at the World Karate Championships held in Dubai, United Arab Emirates.

She competed in the women's kumite 55 kg at the 2022 World Games held in Birmingham, United States.

Achievements

References

External links 
 

Living people
1985 births
Place of birth missing (living people)
Brazilian female karateka
Pan American Games medalists in karate
Pan American Games gold medalists for Brazil
Pan American Games silver medalists for Brazil
Pan American Games bronze medalists for Brazil
Medalists at the 2007 Pan American Games
Medalists at the 2011 Pan American Games
Medalists at the 2015 Pan American Games
Medalists at the 2019 Pan American Games
Karateka at the 2007 Pan American Games
Karateka at the 2011 Pan American Games
Karateka at the 2015 Pan American Games
Karateka at the 2019 Pan American Games
World Games medalists in karate
World Games gold medalists
Competitors at the 2017 World Games
Competitors at the 2022 World Games
South American Games medalists in karate
South American Games gold medalists for Brazil
South American Games silver medalists for Brazil
South American Games bronze medalists for Brazil
Competitors at the 2010 South American Games
Competitors at the 2014 South American Games
Competitors at the 2018 South American Games
Competitors at the 2022 South American Games
21st-century Brazilian women